Popovski is a Macedonian surname that may refer to:

Aleksandar Popovski- Macedonian football defender.
Lazar Popovski- (b. 1975) Macedonian kayaker.
Zivko Popovski- (1934–2007) Macedonian architect.
Zoran T. Popovski- Macedonian scientist.
Lupco "Lewis" Popovski- a Macedonian born Intellectual Property Attorney

Surnames
Macedonian-language surnames